The 64th NAIA Division I men's basketball tournament was held in March at the Tulsa Convention Center in Tulsa, Oklahoma. It was the second tournament held in the Tulsa Convention Center and the last tournament to be held in Tulsa, Oklahoma. The 64th annual NAIA basketball tournament featured 32 teams playing in a single-elimination format. 2001 would bring four new teams to the NAIA national semifinals. The first tournament since 1969 tournament to do so. (It would be the 6th time in tournament history this has happened; previous years were the inaugural year 1937, 1945, 1947, 1965, 1969). It surpasses the 15 year gap between a fresh set of semi-finalist that was between 1947-1969. It would be the only time this would happen outside of Kansas City.

In the end, Faulkner University would win out over University of Science and Arts of Oklahoma, with a score of 63 to 59. The others rookies in the semifinals were Pikeville College and Christian Heritage (Calif.). USAO would eventually come back and win in 2002 national tournament.

Awards and honors
Leading scorer: DuJuan Brown, Oklahoma Baptist, in 3 games DuJuan scored 34 field goals, 8 FT, totaling 78 points, (avg 26.0/game)
Leading rebounder: Randy Hughes, USAO in 5 games Randy grabbed 56 rebounds (avg 11.2/game)
Most consecutive tournament appearances: 10th, Georgetown (KY)
Most tournament appearances: Georgetown (KY), 20th of 28, appearances to the NAIA Tournament.

2001 NAIA bracket

  * denotes each overtime.

See also
2001 NAIA Division I women's basketball tournament
2001 NCAA Division I men's basketball tournament
2001 NCAA Division II men's basketball tournament
2001 NCAA Division III men's basketball tournament
2001 NAIA Division II men's basketball tournament

References

NAIA Men's Basketball Championship
Tournament
NAIA Division I men's basketball tournament
NAIA Division I men's basketball tournament